Chlamydocardia is a genus of flowering plants belonging to the family Acanthaceae.

Its native range is western Tropical Africa to Uganda.

The genus name of Chlamydocardia is from the Greek word chlamydos meaning cloak or short mantle and also from the Greek kardia meaning heart.

Species:
Chlamydocardia buettneri 
Chlamydocardia subrhomboidea

References

Acanthaceae
Acanthaceae genera
Flora of Uganda